Edward J. "E. J." Singler (born June 6, 1990) is an American professional basketball player who last played for the Canterbury Rams of the New Zealand National Basketball League (NZNBL). He played college basketball for the University of Oregon. As a senior at Oregon, he was named to the All-Pac-12 first team.

High school career
Singler attended South Medford High School where he was the 2009 OSAA 6A State Player of the Year after averaging 21.8 points, 10.8 rebounds, 5.0 assists, 1.4 blocks and 1.0 steals per game as a senior, helping the Panthers to a 21-8 record and a sixth-place finish at the OSAA Class 6A tournament. He also was named the 2009 Gatorade Oregon Boys Basketball Player of the Year and the Southwest Conference Player of the Year.

College career
In his senior year with the Oregon Ducks, Singler averaged 11.7 points, 4.9 rebounds, and 2.8 assists in 31 minutes per game as the Ducks advanced to the Sweet 16 of the NCAA Tournament.

Professional career

2013–14 season
After going undrafted in the 2013 NBA draft, Singler joined the Detroit Pistons for the 2013 NBA Summer League. On September 4, 2013, he signed with the Portland Trail Blazers. However, he was later waived by the Trail Blazers on October 22 after appearing in two preseason games. In November 2013, he was acquired by the Idaho Stampede of the NBA Development League.

2014–15 season
On September 8, 2014, Singler signed with Estonian club BC Kalev/Cramo for the 2014–15 season. He appeared in 60 games for the club, averaging 6.9 points and 3.4 rebounds per game.

2015–16 season
On October 21, 2015, Singler signed with the Utah Jazz, but was waived the next day. On November 1, he returned to the Idaho Stampede. On November 13, he made his season debut for Idaho in a 110–106 loss to the Rio Grande Valley Vipers, recording 20 points, five rebounds, two assists and three steals in 36 minutes. On March 4, 2016, he was traded to Raptors 905 in exchange for a 2016 second-round draft pick. On March 11, he made his debut for Raptors 905 in a 102–98 win over the Iowa Energy, recording 12 points, two rebounds and three assists in 27 minutes off the bench.

2016–17 season
In July 2016, Singler joined the Toronto Raptors for the 2016 NBA Summer League. On September 8, 2016, he signed with Toronto, but was waived on October 22 after appearing in four preseason games. On October 30, 2016, he was reacquired by Raptors 905.

2017–18 season
On November 27, 2017, Singler signed with German club s.Oliver Würzburg for the rest of the 2017–18 BBL season.

2018–19 season
On September 12, 2018, Singler signed with the Greek team Panionios. He parted ways with the team in January 2019. In April 2019, he joined the Hawke's Bay Hawks for the 2019 New Zealand NBL season.

2019–20 season
On July 26, 2019, Singler signed with the Brisbane Bullets in Australia for the 2019–20 NBL season. He appeared in all 28 games for the Bullets, averaging 8.0 points, 4.2 rebounds and 1.8 assists per game.

2020–21 season
Singler had signed with the Canterbury Rams in February 2020 for the New Zealand NBL season, but was unable to join the team due to the COVID-19 pandemic. He re-signed with the Rams a year later for the 2021 season. On June 13, 2021, he scored 41 points on 16-of-16 shooting to go with seven rebounds, nine assists and three steals in a 103–85 win over the Taranaki Mountainairs.

Personal life
Singler's father, Ed, played quarterback at Oregon State between 1978 and 1982, while his mother, Kris, played basketball also at Oregon State between 1973 and 1976. His older brother, Kyle, is also a professional basketball player.

References

External links
NBA D-League profile
Oregon Ducks bio

1990 births
Living people
American expatriate basketball people in Australia
American expatriate basketball people in Canada
American expatriate basketball people in Estonia
American expatriate basketball people in Germany
American expatriate basketball people in Greece
American expatriate basketball people in New Zealand
American men's basketball players
Basketball players from Oregon
BC Kalev/Cramo players
Brisbane Bullets players
Canterbury Rams players
Hawke's Bay Hawks players
Idaho Stampede players
Oregon Ducks men's basketball players
Panionios B.C. players
Raptors 905 players
Small forwards
s.Oliver Würzburg players
Sportspeople from Medford, Oregon